A Panhard rod (also called Panhard bar, track bar, or track rod) is a suspension link that provides lateral location of the axle. Originally invented by the Panhard automobile company of France in the early twentieth century, this device has been widely used ever since.

Overview
The purpose of automobile suspension is to let the wheels move vertically with respect to the body.  It is thus undesirable to allow them to move forward and backwards (longitudinally), or side to side (laterally). The Panhard rod prevents lateral movement. The Panhard bar is a simple device, consisting of a rigid bar running sideways in the same plane as the axle, connecting one end of the axle to the car body or chassis on the opposite side of the vehicle. The bar attaches on either end with pivots that let it swivel upwards and downwards only, so that the axle can move in the vertical plane only. This does not effectively locate the axle longitudinally, therefore it is usually used in conjunction with trailing arms that stabilize the axle in the longitudinal direction. This arrangement is not usually used with a leaf spring  suspension, where the springs themselves supply enough lateral rigidity, but only with coil spring suspensions. However, Ford used a similar connected rear axle damper (fifth shock) on some Explorers and light trucks with rear leaf springs. Jaguar also used a Panhard rod to locate the rear axle on its unusual cantilever leaf sprung Mark 2.

Advantages and disadvantages
The advantage of the Panhard rod is its simplicity. Its major disadvantage is that the body must necessarily move in an arc relative to the axle, with the radius equal to the length of the Panhard rod. If the rod is too short, it allows excessive sideways movement between the axle and the body at the ends of the spring travel. Therefore, the Panhard rod is less desirable on smaller cars than larger ones. One exception to this is Mitsubishi Pajero Mini and Suzuki Jimny. Both are small vehicles (they fall in the light vehicles category in Japan) that have a Panhard rod, but the off-road nature of these vehicles mean that the lateral movement between axle and body is not important. A suspension design that is similar but dramatically reduces the sideways component of the axle's vertical travel is Watt's linkage.

Applications
Some vehicles with live-axle suspensions, where Watt's linkage is not an option, e.g. a number of Land Rover models use a Panhard rod as a component of the front suspension. The Mercedes G-class was redesigned in 2018 to include a Panhard rod on the rear axle to improve its on-road handling characteristics.

See also 
 Scott Russell linkage

References 

Automotive suspension technologies
Linkages (mechanical)
Panhard